Second Wind is a 1978 French drama film directed by Gérard Blain, starring Robert Stack and Anicée Alvina. It tells the story of a man in his 50s who leaves his wife and children to live with a woman 30 years younger than himself, only to discover an unsettling link between the woman and a man of his age who had been in a motorcycle accident.

Cast
 Robert Stack as François Davis
 Anicée Alvina as Catherine
 Sophie Desmarets as Louise Davis
 Mareike Carrière as Sophie
 Frédéric Meisner as Marc
 César Chauveau as Catherine's brother

References

1978 drama films
1978 films
Films directed by Gérard Blain
French drama films
1970s French-language films
1970s French films